Brian Buchanan (born 2 November 1986) is a Jamaican cricketer. He played in five first-class matches for the Jamaican cricket team in 2013 and 2014.

See also
 List of Jamaican representative cricketers

References

External links
 

1986 births
Living people
Jamaican cricketers
Jamaica cricketers
People from Clarendon Parish, Jamaica